Daniel is a 1983 British-American drama film directed by Sidney Lumet, which was adapted by E. L. Doctorow from his 1971 novel The Book of Daniel. Paul and Rochelle Isaacson (based on Julis and Ethel Rosenberg) are played by Mandy Patinkin and Lindsay Crouse. Their son Daniel is played by Timothy Hutton, his wife Phyllis by Ellen Barkin, and their (fictional) daughter Susan by Amanda Plummer. In actuality, the Rosenbergs had two sons, Michael and Robert. Ed Asner and Maria Tucci also appear in the film.

Plot
The film was based on the life story of Julius and Ethel Rosenberg, who were convicted as spies and executed in the electric chair by the United States government in 1953 for giving nuclear secrets to the Soviet Union. This story follows their fictionalized son as he attempts to find out the truth.

Cast
Timothy Hutton as Daniel Isaacson
Mandy Patinkin as Paul Isaacson
Lindsay Crouse as Rochelle Isaacson
Edward Asner as Jacob Ascher
Ellen Barkin as Phyllis Isaacson
Julie Bovasso as Frieda Stein
Tovah Feldshuh as Linda Mindish
Carmen Mathews as Mrs. Ascher
Amanda Plummer as Susan Isaacson
Lee Richardson as Reporter
John Rubinstein as Robert Lewin
Colin Stinton as Dale
Maria Tucci as Lise Lewin
Ilan Mitchell-Smith as Young Daniel Isaacson
Peter Friedman as Ben Cohen
Will Lee as Judge (posthumously, his last appearance)
David Margulies as Dr. Duberstein
Leo Burmester as FBI Agent
Rosetta LeNoire as Prison Matron
Ron McLarty as Prison Guard
Nicholas Saunders as Jail Doctor
Daniel Stern as Artie Sternlicht
Lee Wallace as Mayor

Reception
Daniel received mixed reviews and was not a box office success upon its limited release. It currently holds a 43% rating on Rotten Tomatoes.

References

External links

Daniel
Films based on American novels
Daniel
Films about capital punishment
Films set in New York City
Films set in Washington, D.C.
Films set in Los Angeles
Films set in the 1930s
Films set in the 1940s
Films set in the 1950s
Films set in the 1960s
1983 drama films
Cultural depictions of Julius and Ethel Rosenberg
1980s English-language films